The 2013 Friuli-Venezia Giulia regional election took place on 21–22 April 2013 in the Friuli-Venezia Giulia region of Italy.

Debora Serracchiani, Socialist MEP and regional leader of the Democratic Party (PD), narrowly defeated incumbent Renzo Tondo of The People of Freedom (PdL) 39.4% to 39.0%; Saverio Galluccio of the Five Star Movement (M5S) came third with 19.2% of the vote. Serracchiani was the second woman to hold the office of President of Friuli-Venezia Giulia, after Alessandra Guerra of the Northern League (LN) in 1994–1995. The turnout was a record low as a mere 50.5% of eligible voters turned out to vote.

In the election, the PD was the most voted list with 26.8% (resulting in 20 seats, including Serracchiani's), but the combined result of the PdL and its sister-list Responsible Autonomy (comprising PdL members, centre-right independents and the Friulian Autonomist Movement) was 30.7% (resulting in a total of 13 seats including Tondo's). Other than LN (8.3%, 3 seats), two other regional parties, Citizens for the President (5.3%, 3 seats) and Slovene Union (1.4%, 1 seat, Slovene minority), gained seats in the Regional Council.

On the same day of the regional election, also provincial and municipal elections were held. LN's Pietro Fontanini was re-elected President of the Province of Udine by beating PD's Andrea Lerussi 50.0% to 41.1%. In the occasion, the separatist Friulian Front made its debut in electoral politics with 5.7% of the vote. In Udine no candidate for mayor passed the required 50%; a run-off will be held on 5–6 May.

Results

References

External links

Results

2013 elections in Italy
Elections in Friuli-Venezia Giulia
April 2013 events in Italy